Caldera is the debut album by the jazz fusion band Caldera that was released in 1976 by Capitol Records. The album rose to No. 33 on the Cashbox Top 40 Jazz Albums chart.

Track listing

Personnel 
 Jorge Strunz — acoustic guitar, electric guitar, percussion
 Eduardo del Barrio — acoustic piano, electric piano, synthesizers, percussion, clavinet, vocals
 Steve Tavaglione — soprano saxophone, flute, bass, alto flute
 Mike Azeredo — congas, percussion
 Carlos Vega — drums, percussion
 Dean Cortez — electric bass
 Raul De Souza — bass trombone, trombone
 Roberto da Silva — percussion
 Carolyn Dennis — vocals

References 

1976 debut albums
Capitol Records albums
Caldera (band) albums
Albums produced by Wayne Henderson (musician)
Reissue albums